The Baikonur Cosmodrome is a spaceport in an area of southern Kazakhstan leased to Russia. The Cosmodrome is the world's first spaceport for orbital and human launches and the largest (in area) operational space launch facility. All crewed Russian spaceflights are launched from Baikonur.

The spaceport is currently leased by the Kazakh Government to the Russian Federation until 2050 and is managed jointly by the Roscosmos and the Russian Aerospace Forces.

Baikonur Cosmodrome was established on 2 June 1955 by the former Soviet Ministry of Defence. It was originally built as the base of operations for the Soviet space program. Both Sputnik 1, the first artificial satellite, and Vostok 1, the first human spaceflight, were launched from Baikonur. The launch pad used for both missions was renamed Gagarin's Start, in honour of Soviet cosmonaut Yuri Gagarin, pilot of Vostok 1 and first human in space. Under the current Russian management, Baikonur remains a busy spaceport, with numerous commercial, military and scientific missions being launched annually.

History

Soviet era

The Soviet government issued the decree for Scientific Research Test Range No. 5 (NIIP-5) on 12 February 1955. It was actually founded on 2 June 1955, originally a test center for the world's first intercontinental ballistic missile (ICBM), the R-7 Semyorka. NIIP-5 was soon expanded to include launch facilities for space flights. The site was selected by a commission led by General Vasily Voznyuk, influenced by Sergey Korolyov, the Chief Designer of the R-7 ICBM, and soon the man behind the Soviet space program. It had to be surrounded by plains, as the radio control system of the rocket required (at the time) receiving uninterrupted signals from ground stations hundreds of kilometres away. Additionally, the missile trajectory had to be away from populated areas. Also, it is advantageous to place space launch sites closer to the equator, as the surface of the Earth has higher rotational speed in such areas. Taking these constraints into consideration, the commission chose Tyuratam, a village in the heart of the Kazakh Steppe. The expense of constructing the launch facilities and the several hundred kilometres of new road and train lines made the Cosmodrome one of the most costly infrastructure projects undertaken by the Soviet Union. A supporting town was built around the facility to provide housing, schools, and infrastructure for workers. It was raised to city status in 1966 and named Leninsk.

The American U-2 high-altitude reconnaissance plane found and photographed the Tyuratam missile test range for the first time on 5 August 1957.

Name
There are conflicting sources about origins of the name Baikonur.

Other sources state that Baikonur was the name of the Tyuratam region before the establishment of the cosmodrome. Leninsk, the closed city built to support the cosmodrome, was renamed Baikonur on 20 December 1995 by Boris Yeltsin.

Environmental impact
Russian scientist Afanasiy Ilich Tobonov researched mass animal deaths in the 1990s and concluded that the mass deaths of birds and wildlife in the Sakha Republic were noted only along the flight paths of space rockets launched from the Baikonur cosmodrome. Dead wildlife and livestock were usually incinerated, and the participants in these incinerations, including Tobonov himself, his brothers and inhabitants of his native village of Eliptyan, commonly died from stroke or cancer. In 1997, the Ministry of Defense of the Russian Federation changed the flight path and removed the ejected rocket stages near Nyurbinsky District, Russia.

Scientific literature collected data that indicated adverse effects of rockets on the environment and the health of the population. UDMH, a fuel used in Russian rocket engines, is highly toxic. It is one of the reasons for acid rains and cancers in the local population, near the cosmodrome. Valery Yakovlev, a head of the laboratory of ecosystem research of the State scientific-production union of applied ecology "Kazmechanobr", notes:
"Scientists have established the extreme character of the destructive influence of the "Baikonur" space center on environment and population of the region: 11 000 tons of space scrap metal, polluted by especially toxic UDMH is still laying on the falling grounds". Scrap recovery is part of the local economy.

Importance
Many historic flights lifted off from Baikonur: the first operational ICBM; the first man-made satellite, Sputnik 1, on 4 October 1957; the first spacecraft to travel close to the Moon, Luna 1, on 2 January 1959; the first crewed and orbital flight by Yuri Gagarin on 12 April 1961; and the flight of the first woman in space, Valentina Tereshkova, in 1963. 14 cosmonauts of 13 other nations, including Czechoslovakia, East Germany, India and France have launched from Baikonur under the Interkosmos program as well. In 1960, a prototype R-16 ICBM exploded before launch, killing over 100 people. Baikonur is also the site from which Venera 9 and Mars 3 were launched.

Russian era

Following the dissolution of the Soviet Union in 1991, the Russian space program continued to operate from Baikonur under the auspices of the Commonwealth of Independent States. Russia wanted to sign a 99-year lease for Baikonur, but agreed to a US$115 million annual lease of the site for 20 years with an option for a 10-year extension. On 8 June 2005, the Russian Federation Council ratified an agreement between Russia and Kazakhstan extending Russia's rent term of the spaceport until 2050. In an attempt to reduce its dependency on Baikonur, Russia is constructing the Vostochny Cosmodrome in Amur Oblast.

Baikonur has been a major part of Russia's contribution to the International Space Station (ISS), as it is the only spaceport from which Russian missions to the ISS are launched. It is primarily the border's position (but to a lesser extent Baikonur's position at about the 46th parallel north) that led to the 51.6° orbital inclination of the ISS; the lowest inclination that can be reached by Soyuz boosters launched from Baikonur without flying over China. With the conclusion of NASA's Space Shuttle program in 2011, Baikonur became the sole launch site used for crewed missions to the ISS until the launch of Crew Dragon Demo-2 in 2020.

In 2019, Gagarin's Start hosted three crewed launches, in March, July and September, before being modernised for the new Soyuz-2 rocket with a planned first launch of 2023. The final launch from Gagarin's Start took place 25 September 2019.

On March 7, 2023, the Kazakh government seized control of Baikonur Cosmodrome banning numerous Russian officials from leaving the country and preventing the liquidation of assets by Roscosmos. One of the reasons for the seized was due to Russia failing to pay their debts to the Kazakh government. The seizure comes after Russia's relations with Kazakhstan became tense due to the ongoing war in Ukraine.

Features
Baikonur is fully equipped with facilities for launching both crewed and uncrewed spacecraft. It supports several generations of Russian spacecraft: Soyuz, Proton, Tsyklon, Dnepr, Zenit and Buran.

Downrange from the launchpad, spent launch equipment is dropped directly on the ground in the Russian far east where it is salvaged by the workers and the local population.

List of launchpads

 Pad 1/5 (Gagarin's Start): Soyuz-Soyuz, Soyuz-Progress, Soyuz-Ikar – 
 Pad 31/6: Soyuz-Kosmos, Soyuz-Fregat – 
 Pad 41/3: R-16 (Destroyed in 1960 explosion) – 
 Pad 41/4 : R-16 (1961–67) – 
 Pad 41/15: R-16, Kosmos 3 (1963–68) – 
 Pad 45/1: Zenit-2, Zenit-2M, Zenit-3M – 
 Pad 45/2 (Destroyed in 1990 explosion): Zenit 2 – 
 Pad 51: R-9 (1961–62) – 
 Pad 60/6: R-16 (1963–66) — 
 Pad 60/7: R-16 (1963–67) — 
 Pad 60/8: R-16 (1962–66) — 
 Pad 67/21: Tsyklon, R-36M, R-36O, MR-UR-100 Sotka (1963–72) – 
 Pad 67/22: Tsyklon, R-36, R-36O (1964–66) — 
 Pad 69: Tsyklon-2
 Pad 70 (Destroyed in 1963 explosion): R-9 – 
 Pad 75: R-9 — 
 Pad 80/17: Tsyklon (1965) — 
 Pad 81/23 (81L) (inactive >2004): Proton-K – 
 Pad 81/24 (81P): Proton-M – 
 Pad 90/19 (90L) (Inactive >1997): UR-200, Tsyklon-2 – 
 Pad 90/20 (90R): UR-200, Tsyklon-2 – 
 Pad 101: R-36M (1973–76) — 
 Pad 102: R-36M (1978) — 
 Pad 103: R-36M (1973–77) — 
 Pad 104: R-36M (1972–74) — 
 Pad 105: R-36M (1974–77) — 
 Pad 106: R-36M (1974–83) — 
 Pad 107: R-36 — 
 Pad 108: R-36 — 
 Pad 109/95: Dnepr – 
 Pad 110/37 (110L) (inactive >1988): N-1, Energia-Buran – 
 Pad 110/38 (110R) (inactive >1969): N-1  – 
 Pad 130: UR-100 (1965) – 
 Pad 131: UR-100N, UR-100, Rokot (1965–90) — 
 Pad 132: UR-100NU (2001–02) — 
 Pad 140/18: R-36 (1965–78) — 
 Pad 141: R-36 — 
 Pad 142/34: R-36 (three silo complex) — 
 Pad 160: R-36O — 
 Pad 161/35: Tsyklon (1967–73) — 
 Pad 162/36: Tsyklon (1966–75) — 
 Pad 163: R-36O — 
 Pad 164: R-36O — 
 Pad 165: R-36O — 
 Pad 170: UR-MR-100 (1976–79) — 
 Pad 171: UR-100, UR-100N — 
 Pad 172: UR-MR-100 (1978–81) — 
 Pad 173: UR-MR-100 (1972–78) — 
 Pad 174: UR-100, UR-100K — 
 Pad 175/2: UR-100NU, Rokot, Strela – 
 Pad 175/59: Rokot (1994) — 
 Pad 176: UR-100 — 
 Pad 177: UR-MR-100, UR-MR-100U (1973–78) — 
 Pad 178: UR-100 — 
 Pad 179: UR-100 — 
 Pad 181: UR-MR-100U (1978–79) — 
 Pad 191/66: R-36O (1969–71) — 
 Pad 192: R-36O — 
 Pad 193: R-36O — 
 Pad 194: R-36O — 
 Pad 195: R-36O — 
 Pad 196: R-36O — 
 Pad 200/39 (200L): Proton-M/Proton-K – 
 Pad 200/40 (200R): Proton-K (inactive >1991) – 
 Pad 241: R-36O — 
 Pad 242: R-36O — 
 Pad 243: R-36O — 
 Pad 244: R-36O — 
 Pad 245: R-36O — 
 Pad 246: R-36O — 
 Pad 250 (inactive >1987): Energia –

Buran facilities

As part of the Buran programme, several facilities were adapted or newly built for the Buran-class space shuttle orbiters:

 Site 110 – Used for the launch of the Buran-class orbiters. Like the assembly and processing hall at Site 112, the launch complex was originally constructed for the Soviet lunar landing program and later converted for the Energia-Buran program.
 Site 112 – Used for orbiter maintenance and to mate the orbiters to their Energia launchers (thus fulfilling a role similar to the VAB at KSC). The main hangar at the site, called MIK RN or MIK 112, was originally built for the assembly of the N1 moon rocket. After cancellation of the N-1 program in 1974, the facilities at Site 112 were converted for the Energia-Buran program. It was here that Orbiter K1 was stored after the end of the Buran program and was destroyed when the hangar roof collapsed in 2002.
 Site 251 – Used as Buran orbiter landing facility, also known as Yubileyniy Airfield (and fulfilling a role similar to the SLF at KSC). At the edge of the runway was a special mating–demating device, designed to lift an orbiter off its Antonov An-225 Mriya carrier aircraft and load it on a transporter, which would carry the orbiter to the processing building at Site 254. A purpose-built orbiter landing control facility, housed in a large multi-store office building, was located near the runway. Yubileyniy Airfield was also used to receive heavy transport planes carrying elements of the Energia-Buran system. After the end of the Buran program, Site 251 was abandoned but later reopened as a commercial cargo airport. Besides serving Baikonur, Kazakh authorities also use it for passenger and charter flights from Russia.
 Site 254 – Built to service the Buran-class orbiters between flights (thus fulfilling a role similar to the OPF at KSC). Constructed in the 1980s as a special four-bay building, it also featured a large processing area flanked by several floors of test rooms. After cancellation of the Buran program it was adapted for pre-launch operations of the Soyuz and Progress spacecraft.

Baikonur Railway

All Baikonur's logistics are based on its own intra-site  gauge railway network, which is the largest industrial railway on the planet. The railway is used for all stages of launch preparation, and all spacecraft are transported to the launchpads by the special Schnabel cars. Once part of the Soviet Railroad Troops, the Baikonur Railway is now served by a dedicated civilian state company. There are several rail links connecting the Baikonur Railway to the public railway of Kazakhstan and the rest of the world.

Baikonur airports
The Baikonur Cosmodrome has two on-site multi-purpose airports, serving both the personnel transportation needs and the logistics of space launches (including the delivery of the spacecraft by planes).  There are scheduled passenger services from Moscow to the smaller Krayniy Airport , which however are not accessible to the public. The larger Yubileyniy Airport (Юбилейный аэропорт)  was where the Buran orbiter was transported to Baikonur on the back of the Antonov An-225 Mriya cargo aircraft.

ICBM testing
Although Baikonur has always been known around the world as the launch site of Soviet and Russian space missions, from its outset in 1955 and until the collapse of the USSR in 1991 the primary purpose of this center was to test liquid-fueled ballistic missiles. The official (and secret) name of the center was State Test Range No. 5 or 5 GIK. It remained under the control of the Soviet and Russian Ministry of Defense until the second half of the 1990s, when the Russian civilian space agency and its industrial contractors started taking over individual facilities.

In 2006, the head of Roscosmos, Anatoly Perminov, said that the last Russian military personnel would be removed from the Baikonur facility by 2007. However, on 22 October 2008, an SS-19 Stiletto missile was test-fired from Baikonur, indicating this may not be the case.

Future projects
On 22 December 2004, Kazakhstan and Russia signed a contract establishing the "Russia–Kazakhstan Baiterek JV" joint venture, in which each country holds a 50% stake. The goal of the project is the construction of the Bayterek ("poplar tree") space launch complex, to facilitate operations of the Russian Angara rocket launcher. This will allow launches with a payload of 26 tons to low Earth orbit, compared to 20 tons using the Proton system. An additional benefit will be that the Angara uses kerosene as fuel and oxygen as the oxidiser, which is less hazardous to the environment than the toxic fuels used by older boosters. The total expenditure on the Kazakh side will be US$223 million over 19 years. As of 2010, the project was stalling due to insufficient funding. It was thought that the project still had good chances to succeed because it will allow both parties – Russia and Kazakhstan – to continue the joint use of Baikonur even after the Vostochny Cosmodrome is commissioned. The first scheduled launch of the Baiterek Rocket and Space Complex is scheduled for 2025.

Baikonur Museum

Baikonur Cosmodrome has a small museum, next to two small cottages, once residences of the rocket engineer Sergei Korolev and the first cosmonaut, Yuri Gagarin. Both cottages are part of the museum complex and have been preserved. The museum is home to a collection of space artifacts. A restored test artifact from the Soviet Buran programme sits next to the museum entrance. The vehicle that flew a single orbital test mission in 1988 was destroyed in a hangar collapse in 2002; For a complete list of Buran artifacts, see Buran (spacecraft).

The museum also houses photographs related to the cosmodrome's history, including images of all cosmonauts. Every crew of every expedition launched from Baikonur leaves behind a signed crew photograph that is displayed behind the glass.

Baikonur's museum holds many objects related to Gagarin, including the ground control panel from his flight, his uniforms, and soil from his landing site, preserved in a silver container. One of the museum rooms also holds an older version of the Soyuz descent capsule.

In 2021, the Baikonur space complex was named as one of the top 10 tourist destinations in Kazakhstan.

See also

 Vostochny Cosmodrome
 Plesetsk Cosmodrome
 Svobodny Cosmodrome
 Kapustin Yar

References

Further reading 
 J. K. Golovanov, M., "Korolev: Facts and myths", Nauka, 1994, 
 "Rockets and people" – B. E. Chertok, M: "mechanical engineering", 1999.  
 "A breakthrough in space" – Konstantin Vasilyevich Gerchik, M: LLC "Veles", 1994, – 
 "At risk," – A. A. Toul, Kaluga, "the Golden path", 2001, – 
 "Testing of rocket and space technology – the business of my life" Events and facts – A.I. Ostashev, Korolev, 2001.Bibliography 1996–2004
 "Baikonur. Korolev. Yangel." – M. I. Kuznetsk, Voronezh: IPF "Voronezh", 1997, 
 "Look back and look ahead. Notes of a military engineer" – Rjazhsky A. A., 2004, SC. first, the publishing house of the "Heroes of the Fatherland" .
 "Rocket and space feat Baikonur" – Vladimir Порошков, the "Patriot" publishers 2007. 
 "Unknown Baikonur" – edited by B. I. Posysaeva, M.: "globe", 2001. 
 "Bank of the Universe" – edited by Boltenko A. C., Kyiv, 2014., publishing house "Phoenix", 
 
 "I look back and have no regrets. " - Author: Abramov, Anatoly Petrovich: publisher "New format" Barnaul, 2022.

External links

 Baikonur Cosmodrome historical note (in Russian) and historical pictures (2002) on buran.ru – NPO Molniya, maker of Russian space shuttle Buran.
 RussianSpaceWeb.com on Baikonur
 360° interactive panoramas of Baikonur Cosmodrome
 Baikonur: the town, the cosmodrome, the MetOp-A launch campaign
 "World's Oldest Space Launch Facility: The Baikonur Cosmodrome." Sometimes Interesting. 26 May 2014
 Nedelin Disaster // RussianSpaceWeb.com 
 The official website of the city administration Baikonur // Baikonur commemorated a test rocket and space technology.
 The Russian Union Of Veterans // Day of memory and grief.

 
Infrastructure completed in 1955
Spaceports
Transport buildings and structures in Kazakhstan
Kazakhstan–Russia relations
Space program of Kazakhstan
Rocket launch sites
Soviet and Russian space program locations
Buildings and structures built in the Soviet Union
Baikonur
1955 establishments in the Soviet Union